
This is a list of aircraft in alphabetical order beginning with 'S'.

Sk

Skandinaviska Aero
(Skandinaviska Aero AB, Sweden / Erick Bratt, Karl-Erik Hilfing & Björn Törnblom / BHT)
 Skandinaviska Aero BHT-1 Beauty

Skif Paragliding
(Feodosia, Ukraine)
Skif BigSkif Bi
Skif Phaeton
Skif Raptor
Skif Sarmat
Skif Skif-A

Skipper
(WA Skipper, Greeley, Colorado, United States)
Skipper Scrappy UAC-200

Skliar 
 Skliar Aqua Glider

Škoda 
 Škoda D.1
 Škoda P.2

Škoda-Kauba 
(Škoda-Kauba Flugzeugbau)
 Škoda-Kauba SK V-1
 Škoda-Kauba SK V-2
 Škoda-Kauba SK V-3
 Škoda-Kauba SK V-4
 Škoda-Kauba SK V-5
 Škoda-Kauba SK V-6
 Škoda-Kauba SK V-7
 Škoda-Kauba SK V-8
 Škoda-Kauba SK V-9
 Škoda-Kauba SK V-10
 Škoda-Kauba SK V-11
 Škoda-Kauba SK 257
 Škoda-Kauba SK SL-6 a modified SK V6 in order to perform tests for the Blohm & Voss P.208
 Škoda-Kauba SK P14 ramjet fighter project

Skopiński
(Aero-service Jacek Skopiński)
 Skopiński Panda
 Skopiński Puma

Skraba
(Boleslaw Skraba)
 Skraba S.T.3

Skroback 
(Frank E. Skroback)
 Skroback Roadable Airplane

SKT Swiss Kopter Technology SA
(Ambrì, Switzerland)
SKT Skyrider 06

Sky Romer 
(Sky Romer Mfg Co, Inc., (Paul) Hobrock & Associates, Sweebrock Airport, Fort Wayne, Indiana, United States)
 Sky Romer

Sky Seeker Powerchutes
(Woking, Alberta, Canada)
Sky Seeker Powerchutes Sky Seeker

Skye Treck 
 Skye Treck Skyseeker Mk I
 Skye Treck Skyseeker Mk II
 Skye Treck Skyseeker Mk III

Skycraft
(Skycraft Inc (pres: James L Robertson), Ft Worth TX.)
 Skycraft Skyshark

SkyCraft 
(SkyCraft Airplanes, LLC, Orem, Utah, United States)
 SkyCraft SD-1 Minisport

Skycrafters
(Skycraft Industries Inc, Venice Ca - see:Skylark)

SkyCruiser Autogyro
(SkyCruiser Autogyro KFT)
 SkyCruiser Autogyro SkyCruiser

SkyDancer Aviation
(Louisville, Kentucky, United States)
SkyDancer SD-200
SkyDancer SD-260
SkyDancer SD-300

Skyeton 
 Skyeton K-10 Swift

Skyfly
(Altbüron, Switzerland)
Skyfly S 34 Skystar

Skyfox 
(Skyfox Corporation, United States)
 Boeing Skyfox

Skyfox 
(Skyfox Aviation, United States)
 Skyfox Aviation Skyfox

Skyhigh
(Skyhigh Ultralights Inc)
Skyhigh Skybaby

Skyjam
(Skyjam Paragliders, Einsiedeln, Switzerland)
Skyjam ST-Freestyle

Skylark Aircraft 
(Skylark Aircraft Co., Muskegon. Michigan, United States)
 Skylark Aircraft 3
 Skylark Aircraft 3-95
 Skylark Aircraft 3-95A

Skylark 
(Skylark Mfg Co, Skycrafters Industries Inc, 350 Washington Blvd, Venice, United States )
 Skylark Skycraft 246
 Skylark Skycraft 445
 Skylark Skycraft 446
 Skylark Skycraft 447

Skyleader Aircraft
(Skyleader Aircraft – Jihlavan Airplanes sro, Jihlava, Czech Republic)
Skyleader GP One
Skyleader 100
Skyleader 200 UL
Skyleader 500 LSA
Skyleader 600
 Skyleader UL-39 Albi (a two-seat microlight version of the Aero L-39 Albatros)

Skyline 
(Skyline Construction Bureau, Kiev, Ukraine)
 Skyline SL-122 Pchelka
 Skyline SL-124
 Skyline SL-125
 Skyline SL-222

Skylon 
 Skylon Concept

Skymaster Powered Parachutes
(Hartland, Wisconsin, United States)
Skymaster Excel
Skymaster Single Seater

Skyote 
(Skyote Aeromarine Ltd, Boulder, Colorado, United States)
 Skyote Aeromarine Skyote

Sky Paragliders
(Frýdlant nad Ostravicí, Czech Republic)
Sky Argos
Sky Anakis
Sky Apollo
Sky Atis
Sky Brontes
Sky Eole
Sky Fides
Sky Flare
Sky Flirt
Sky Gaia
Sky Golem
Sky Kea
Sky Metis
Sky Paragliders Lift

Skyrider
(Skyrider Flugschule, Bayern, Germany)
Skyrider Sonic
Skyrider Stingray

Skyrider
(Skyrider Airships Inc.)
 Skyrider BA-3 (single seat airship)

Skyrunner Paramotor Laboratory
(Pskov, Russia)
 Skyrunner Basic
 Skyrunner Booster
 Skyrunner Light
 Skyrunner Powerful

Sky Science
(Tidworth, United Kingdom)
Sky Science PowerHawk

Skyshooter 
(Tubular Aircraft Prod Co, Los Angeles, California, United States)
 Skyshooter 211

Skyskootor 
(Saalfield Aircraft Co, San Diego, California, United States)
 Skyskootor

Skytek
(Skytek Australia Pty. Ltd. Australia)
 Skytek Maverick

Skystar Aircraft 
(Skystar Aircraft)
 Skystar Aircraft Pulsar

Skywalk GmbH & Co. KG
(Marquartstein, Bavaria, Germany)
Skywalk Arriba
Skywalk Cayenne
Skywalk Chili
Skywalk Hype
Skywalk Join't
Skywalk Masala
Skywalk Mescal
Skywalk Poison
Skywalk Spice
Skywalk Tequila
Skywalk Tonic
Skywalk Tonka
Skywalk X-Alps

Skyway 
(Skyway Engr Co, Carmel, Illinois, United States)
 Skyway AC-35

Skyway Products
(Ettenheim, Germany)
Skyway Light

Skyways 
(Skyways Inc, Boston, Maryland, United States)
 Skyways Amphibienne

Skywise Ultraflight
(Skywise Ultraflight Pte. Ltd.)
 Skywise Ultraflight SV-1 Sadler Vampire (KFM 107ER engine)
 Skywise Ultraflight SV-2 Sadler Vampire (Rotax 447 engine)

References

Further reading

External links

 List Of Aircraft (S)

de:Liste von Flugzeugtypen/N–S
fr:Liste des aéronefs (N-S)
nl:Lijst van vliegtuigtypes (N-S)
pt:Anexo:Lista de aviões (N-S)
ru:Список самолётов (N-S)
sv:Lista över flygplan/N-S
vi:Danh sách máy bay (N-S)